Mathieu Maes (3 May 1944 – 9 May 2017) was a Belgian racing cyclist. He rode in the 1966 Tour de France, achieving 112th place.

References

External links
 

1944 births
2017 deaths
Belgian male cyclists
Place of birth missing